Now That's What I Call Christmas! 2: The Signature Collection also known as Now That's What I Call Christmas! 2 is an album released on September 30, 2003, as part of the Now That's What I Call Music series in the United States. It has sold over a million copies in the US.

Track listing

Disc 1: Now and Forever

Disc 2: Then and Always

See also 
 List of Billboard Top Holiday Albums number ones of the 2000s

Notes

References
 "Now That's What I Call Christmas Lyrics Index", www.songwords.net

Now That's What I Call Music! Christmas albums
2003 compilation albums
2003 Christmas albums
Christmas 02